Sepang may refer to:
Sepang District
Sepang (town)
Sepang (federal constituency), represented in the Dewan Rakyat
Sepang International Circuit, motorsport race track in Sepang, Malaysia